Dansk Sprognævn ( "Danish Language Council") is the official regulatory body of the Danish language as a part of the Danish Ministry of Culture and is located in Bogense. It was established in 1955. The committee has three main objectives:

 to follow the development of the language
 to answer inquiries about the Danish language and its use
 to update the official Danish dictionary, Retskrivningsordbogen

The working members of the committee follow written and broadcast media, read books to keep track of new words and record their usage. New words which have appeared enough in print and speech to be considered notable are added to Retskrivningsordbogen, which all government institutions and schools are obliged by law to follow. The committee receives some 14,000 inquiries by phone or mail each year about the Danish language, half of them from private companies, but also by private citizens.

Dansk Sprognævn cooperates on a daily basis with its equivalents in the other Scandinavian countries, the Swedish and Norwegian Language Councils, to make sure that the three Mainland Scandinavian languages, which are more or less mutually intelligible, do not diverge more than necessary from one another.

See also
Language policy

References

External links
Official site
Danish Ministry of Culture
The legislation that regulates the objectives and the statutes of Dansk Sprognævn

1955 establishments in Denmark
Sprognaevn
Language regulators
Danish language